Thomas George Lyon-Bowes, 12th Earl of Strathmore and Kinghorne (28 September 1822 – 13 September 1865), styled Lord Glamis between 1834 and 1846, was a Scottish peer and cricketer.

Background
Lyon-Bowes was the eldest surviving son of Thomas Lyon-Bowes, Lord Glamis, son of Thomas Bowes-Lyon, 11th Earl of Strathmore and Kinghorne. His mother was Charlotte Grimstead, daughter of Joseph Valentine Grimstead, of Merry Hall, Lower Ashtead, Surrey. He succeeded his grandfather in the earldom in 1846.

Public life
An amateur cricketer, Strathmore played first-class cricket for the Marylebone Cricket Club from 1844 to 1857. In 1852 he was elected a Scottish representative peer, a post he held until July 1865.

Personal life
Lord Strathmore and Kinghorne married the Honourable Charlotte Maria Barrington, daughter of William Barrington, 6th Viscount Barrington, on 30 April 1850. The marriage was childless. She died on 3 November 1854, aged 27. Lord Strathmore and Kinghorne died on 13 September 1865, aged 42, and was succeeded in the earldom by his younger brother, Claude.

References

Strathmore and Kinghorne, Thomas Lyon-Bowes, 12th Earl of
Strathmore and Kinghorne, Thomas Lyon-Bowes, 12th Earl of
12
Thomas Lyon-Bowes, 12th Earl of Strathmore and Kinghorne
Scottish cricketers
Marylebone Cricket Club cricketers
Presidents of the Marylebone Cricket Club
Gentlemen of England cricketers
Grenadier Guards officers